Janak Prasad Humagain (1937-2006) was a social activist and children's poet of Nepal.

Biography
Janak Prasad Humagain was born on 13 October 1937 (28 Ashoj 1994 BS) in Balthali village of Kavrepalanchok District. His mother was Parwata Devi and father was Durga Prasad.

His father gave him the primary education at home. In , he joined a language school at Sorhakhutte, Kathmandu. He also took lesson from Mohan Raj Bajracharya at Jhonchhe, Kathmandu. In , he passed public service intermediate examination. In the same year, he left for Calcutta in India for his further studies. There he met an Englishman named Ray and started to work in his motor workshop in exchange for education in English on morning and evening. After a year, he returned to Kathmandu on request of his father and 
started to prepare for the public service intermediate exam. After two years, he passed the exam and joined as a public servant.

After  the implementation of land reforms program in he  was  transferred  to  Land  Reforms  Office, where  he  was  promoted  as a  Nayabsubba (officer). From , public servants were prohibited to criticize the government, so he quit his job and involved himself in social and political work. He however, rejoined the job due to the poor economic condition. He worked there till 2049 BS and retired.

In retirement life, he taught in school. He died on 11 February 2006 (28 Magh 2063 BS) due to thyroid cancer.

Because it was a child marriage, he and his wife were not actually living together until the next 12 years. They had five sons.

Social activism
In 2007 BS, he founded an organization called Gramniti Sudhar Kendra (meaning Rural Policy Reformation Centre). He systematically opposed the trafficking hydrogenated oil and the Gandak River Agreement with India under his leadership though Janahit Sangh(People  Welfare  Association).

Literary contribution
Humagain started to write poems from his teen age. He has published 28 books. He worked in close coordination with Shanta Das Manandhar, another well known chlildren writer of Nepal. He also worked as an editor for various newspapers and magazines such as Shrinkhala  Monthly (2035 to 2043 BS), Baalposh Sachitra Rangeen Patrika (2036 BS), Pralesha trimonthly (2053 – 2055 BS), etc.

Works
Kishanko Geet (Farmer's  Song)(rhyme,), 
 Euta Nara Lagaunu Parchha Aba (We should raise a slogan now) (short epic,), 
 Nepal  Aamako  Satyabachan  (True  Words  from Mother  of  Nepal)  (short  epic),  
 Pasina (Sweat)  (Collection  of  Poems),  
 Dukhi Garibko Sawai (Poor's Morsel) (rhyme), etc.

Awards and honours
 District Literature Conference, Panauti, 
 District Literature Conference, Dhading, 
 Best  Children Literature Award, 
 Recognition by Education Ministry for his contribution  in  the  development of children literature, 
 Children Welfare Award –Hitkari Guthi, Salt Trading Corporation, 
 Daanmaya  Prativa Puraskar 
 Shrasta Samman, Panauti 
 Felicitated by Sahitya Sandhya, Birgunj 
 Felicitated  by Pushpalal  Smriti Pratisthan, 
 Sajha Children Literature Award 
 Balsahitya Prabardhan Samman

References

Nepalese poets
Nepalese children's writers
People from Kavrepalanchok District
1937 births
2006 deaths
Khas people